HMS Aurochs (P426/S26), was an  of the Royal Navy, built by Vickers Armstrong and launched 28 July 1945. Her namesake was the aurochs (Bos primigenius), an extinct Eurasian wild ox ancestral to domestic cattle and often portrayed in cave art and heraldry.

Operational history
In 1953 she took part in the Fleet Review to celebrate the Coronation of Queen Elizabeth II. During 1953 she was commanded by Lieutenant-Commander A. G. Tait.

On 17 May 1958 Aurochs was patrolling the Molucca Sea off Indonesia when an unidentified aircraft machine-gunned her. The aircraft remained at high altitude and Aurochs sustained no casualties or damage. President Sukarno's Indonesian government told the UK's Conservative Government that its armed forces had not made the attack. The UK Foreign and Commonwealth Office stated that it accepted the assurance and assumed that North Celebes rebels had carried out the attack.

It is true that Permesta rebels in North Sulawesi were supported by a "Revolutionary Air Force", AUREV (Angkatan Udara Revolusioner). However, all AUREV aircraft, munitions and pilots were supplied by the Nationalist Chinese air force or the CIA. Two CIA pilots, William H. Beale and Allen Pope, had been using Douglas B-26 Invader aircraft to attack Indonesian and foreign targets in the area since April 1958. By 17 May Beale had quit the operation, but Pope continued to fly sorties until the day after Aurochs was attacked, 18 May, when he tried to attack an Indonesian Navy convoy but was shot down and captured.

Apart from the Affray which had been lost in an accident in 1951, Aurochs was the only one of her class not to be modernised. In March 1961, the submarine was among the vessels that took part in a combined naval exercise with the United States Navy off Nova Scotia.

Aurochs was decommissioned in 1966 and arrived at Troon in February 1967 for breaking up.

References

Sources

External links
 Pictures of HMS Aurochs at MaritimeQuest

 

Amphion-class submarines
Cold War submarines of the United Kingdom
Ships built in Barrow-in-Furness
1945 ships